The Natlismtsemeli monastery also known as Saint John monastery is a historical and architectural monument within the David Gareja monastery complex, located in the Kakheti region, east of Georgia.

The monastery consists of numerous cave temples and a central church. There is also a smaller church south of the main one. The interiors of the church date from the 12th century.

History 
The foundations of the Natlismtsemeli monastery, located 12 km west of the David Gareja plateau, were laid by Luciane, a student of David Gareja at the end of the 7th century, according to the church's tradition.

Architectural features 
The complex consists of numerous cave temples and a central church. The central church stands out for its extraordinary height. The iconography of the main church dates back to the 18th century.

There is a smaller church south of the main church. To reach that church it is necessary to climb the rock. There is also a tall bell tower and rooms for the monks located in front of that church. The interiors date from the twelfth century.

Fragments of the painted decorations during the first half of the 12th century can be seen inside the church.

See also 
David Gareja Lavra

Literature
 ზ. თვალჭრელიძე, გარეჯის ნათლისმცემლის უდაბნო-მონასტერი, ძეგლის მეგობარი, 80, თბ., 1988

References 
 

Immovable Cultural Monuments of National Significance of Georgia
Georgian Orthodox monasteries